The 2014 bwin World Cup of Darts was the fourth edition of the PDC World Cup of Darts which took place between 6–8 June 2014 at the Alsterdorfer Sporthalle in Hamburg, Germany.

The Netherlands pairing of Michael van Gerwen and Raymond van Barneveld won their country's second World Cup title by defeating defending champions Phil Taylor and Adrian Lewis of England 3–0 in the final.

The Netherlands averaged the third highest television average of 117.88 against Northern Ireland in their semi-final doubles match, the highest ever televised doubles average.

Format
The tournament was expanded from 24 nations to 32 this year. 16 teams were seeded and were drawn to face the remaining 16 teams in the first round. Unlike in previous years, there are no groups this year with the tournament being a straight knockout.

First round: Best of nine legs doubles.
Second round, quarter and semi-finals: Two best of seven legs singles matches. If the scores are tied, a best of seven legs doubles match settled the tie.
Final: Up to the four best of seven legs singles matches. First team to 3 points wins the title. Should the tie be 2–2, then a fifth and final doubles tie will be played.

Prize money
Prize money is per team:

Teams and seeding
In a change to recent years, the top 16 teams were seeded, while the other 16 teams were unseeded.

With there now being 32 nations this year, many new nations entered. The new entrants were China, France, Hong Kong, India, Norway, Singapore and Thailand. Russia also returned after missing the last two events, and Malaysia also returned after missing the 2013 event. 2013 quarter-finalists Croatia didn't return.

Seeded nations

Unseeded nations

Results

Draw

Second round
Two best of seven legs singles matches. If the scores were tied, a best of seven legs doubles match settled the match.

Quarter-finals
Two best of seven legs singles matches. If the scores were tied, a best of seven legs doubles match settled the match.

Semi-finals
Two best of seven legs singles matches. If the scores were tied, a best of seven legs doubles match settled the match.

Final
Three match wins were needed to win the title. Two best of seven legs singles matches were played, followed by reverse singles matches. If the score had been level after that, a best of seven legs doubles match would have been played to determine the champion.

References

2014
World Cup
PDC World Cup of Darts
Sports competitions in Hamburg